The 2022 Rio Open, also known as Rio Open presented by Claro for sponsorship reasons, was a professional men's tennis tournament played on outdoor clay courts. It was the 8th edition of the Rio Open, and part of the ATP Tour 500 of the 2022 ATP Tour. It took place in Rio de Janeiro, Brazil between February 14–20, 2022.

Champions

Singles 

  Carlos Alcaraz def.  Diego Schwartzman 6–4, 6–2

Doubles 

  Simone Bolelli /  Fabio Fognini def.  Jamie Murray /  Bruno Soares 7–5, 6–7(2–7), [10–6]

Points and prize money

Point distribution

Prize money 

*per team

Singles main-draw entrants

Seeds 

 1 Rankings are as of February 7, 2022.

Other entrants 
The following players received wildcards into the singles main draw:
  Felipe Meligeni Alves
  Thiago Monteiro
  Shang Juncheng

The following player received a special exempt into the main draw:
  Francisco Cerúndolo

The following players received entry using a protected ranking into the singles main draw: 
  Pablo Andújar
  Pablo Cuevas
  Fernando Verdasco

The following players received entry from the qualifying draw:
  Sebastián Báez 
  Daniel Elahi Galán 
  Miomir Kecmanović 
  Juan Ignacio Londero

The following players received entry as a lucky loser:
  Roberto Carballés Baena

Withdrawals 
 Before the tournament
  Dominic Thiem → replaced by  Pablo Cuevas
  Casper Ruud → replaced by  Roberto Carballés Baena

Doubles main-draw entrants

Seeds 

 1 Rankings as of February 7, 2022.

Other entrants 
The following pairs received wildcards into the doubles main draw:
  Rogério Dutra Silva /  Orlando Luz
  Rafael Matos /  Felipe Meligeni Alves

The following pair received entry from the qualifying draw:
  Pablo Andújar /  Pedro Martínez

Withdrawals 
 Before the tournament
  Dušan Lajović /  Franko Škugor → replaced by  Laslo Đere /  Dušan Lajović

During the tournament
  Carlos Alcaraz /  Pablo Carreño Busta

References

External links 
 Official website

2022
Rio Open
Rio Open
Rio Open